Constellation Theatre Company is a non-profit theater company located in Washington, D.C. It performs at the Source Theatre, a flexible black box theatre in Washington, D.C. Since its founding in 2007, Constellation has received several Helen Hayes Awards including The John Aniello Award for Outstanding Emerging Theatre Company in 2009.

Facilities

Constellation Theatre Company uses the facilities of CulturalDC's Source at 1835 14th St NW. It features a 120-seat black box performance space. The upper floor has a rehearsal room, conference room, and office space

Artistic leadership
Constellation Theatre Company's founding artistic director is Allison Arkell Stockman. A 1996 graduate of Princeton University and a 2001 graduate of Carnegie Mellon School of Drama, Allison was a freelance director in Washington, DC and New York City. In 2006 she quit her job as a teacher, took short-term jobs for a year, and then started the theater company in 2007.

Since Constellation began in 2007, Managing Director A.J. Guban has been an essential artistic and administrative leader of the organization, developing it as a nonprofit business that strives to implement best practices, and as a company dedicated to serving a community of artists, audience members and stakeholders. A.J. has worn many hats managing the daily business operations of the company, including payroll, website design, human resources, graphic design, and budgeting, as well as marketing and development campaigns.

On top of that, A.J.’s amazing scenic and lighting designs have been vital to Constellation’s identity as a theatre that creates spectacular visual worlds. Of the 49 productions at Constellation, A.J. has created 45 scenic designs and 44 lighting designs. He has received eight Helen Hayes Nominations: Outstanding Lighting Design for The Wild Party, Avenue Q, 36 Views; Outstanding Set Design for The Little Shop of Horrors, The Caucasian Chalk Circle, The Arabian Nights, Journey to the West, 36 Views.

Productions

Current productions

2018-2019 Season: Epic Love
Melancholy Play: A Contemporary Farce by Sarah Ruhl
Aida with music by Elton John, lyrics by Tim Rice, and book by Linda Woolverton, Robert Falls, and David Henry Hwang
The Master and Margarita adapted by Edward Kemp
The White Snake by Mary Zimmerman, based on the Chinese legend of the white snake

Production history

2017-2018 Season: Survival Instincts
The Cabinet of Dr. Caligari, the silent film with live music by Tom Teasley
The Wild Party with book, lyrics, and music by Andrew Lippa
The Skin of Our Teeth by Thornton Wilder
The Caucasian Chalk Circle by Bertolt Brecht

2016-2017 Season
 Metropolis, the silent film with live music by Tom Teasley
 Urinetown music and lyrics by Mark Hollmann, book and lyrics by Greg Kotis
 Peter and the Starcatcher by Rick Elice
 The Arabian Nights by Mary Zimmerman

2015-2016 Season – Playtime for Grownups
The Adventures of Prince Achmed by Lotte Reiniger with live music by Tom Teasley
Avenue Q music and lyrics by Robert Lopez and Jeff Marx, book by Jeff Whitty
Equus by Peter Shaffer
Journey to the West by Mary Zimmerman, based on the 16th century Chinese novel Journey to the West

2014-2015 Season
Absolutely {Perhaps} by Luigi Pirandello (and sometimes titled So It Is (If You Think So) in English) adapted by Martin Sherman
The Lieutenant of Inishmore by Martin McDonagh
The Fire and the Rain, by Girish Karnad and drawn from The Mahabharata

2013-2014 Season
 36 Views by Naomi Iizuka
 Scapin by Bill Irwin and Mark O'Donnell adapted from Les Fourberies de Scapin by Molière
 The Love of the Nightingale, by Timberlake Wertenbaker

2012-2013 Season
 Taking Steps by Alan Ayckbourn
 Zorro* by Janet Allard and Eleanor Holdridge
 Gilgamesh, Poetry by Yusef Komunyakaa, concept & dramaturgy by Chad Gracia
* world premier

2011-2012 Season
The Ramayana (remount)
Arms and the Man
Blood Wedding
Metamorphoses

2010-2011 Season
Women Beware Women
On The Razzle
The Green Bird

2009-2010 Season
A Flea in Her Ear
Three Sisters
The Ramayana

2008-2009 Season
Temptation
The Marriage of Figaro
Crazyface

2007-2008 Season
A Dream Play by August Strindberg adapted by Caryl Churchill 
The Arabian Nights by Mary Zimmerman 
The Good Woman of Setzuan 
The Oresteia

Grants

In September 2013, the American Theatre Wing, (the Founder of the Tony Awards) awarded a National Theatre Company Grant to Constellation Theatre.  The grant is for general operating support to companies that "have articulated a distinctive mission, cultivated an audience, and nurtured a community of artists in ways that strengthen and demonstrate the quality, diversity, and dynamism of American theatre".

Awards
In 2009, Constellation received the John Aniello Award for Outstanding Emerging Theatre Company.

Constellation has received 81 Helen Hayes Nominations and has won 17. All six of Constellation’s eligible productions from the past two years have been nominated.

Outstanding Production in a Musical

Little Shop of Horrors, 2020

The Wild Party, 2018

Urinetown, 2017

Avenue Q, 2016 - WINNER!

Outstanding Production in a Play

Melancholy Play: A Contemporary Farce, 2019 - WINNER!

Equus, 2017

Outstanding Direction in a Musical

Nick Martin, Little Shop of Horrors, 2020

Allison Arkell Stockman, The Wild Party, 2018

Allison Arkell Stockman, Urinetown, 2017

Allison Arkell Stockman, Avenue Q, 2016 - WINNER!

Outstanding Direction in a Play

Nick Martin, Melancholy Play: A Contemporary Farce, 2019 - WINNER!

Outstanding Choreography in a Musical

Ilona Kessell, Little Shop of Horrors, 2020

Ilona Kessell, The Wild Party, 2018

Ilona Kessell, Urinetown, 2017

Rachel Leigh Dolan, Avenue Q, 2016

Outstanding Musical Direction

Walter "Bobby" McCoy, Little Shop of Horrors, 2020

Walter "Bobby" McCoy, Aida, 2019

Walter "Bobby" McCoy, The Wild Party, 2018

Jake Null, Urinetown, 2017

Jake Null, Avenue Q, 2016 - WINNER!

Outstanding Costume Design

Frank Labovitz, Little Shop of Horrors, 2020

Kelsey Hunt, The Caucasian Chalk Circle, 2019

Erik Teague, The Arabian Nights, 2018

Erik Teague, The Wild Party, 2018

Kendra Rai, Journey to the West, 2017

Kara Waala, Avenue Q, 2016

Kendra Rai, The Green Bird, 2012 - WINNER!

Outstanding Set Design

A.J. Guban, The Little Shop of Horrors, 2020

A.J. Guban, The Caucasian Chalk Circle, 2019

A.J. Guban, The Arabian Nights, 2018

Tony Cisek, The Wild Party, 2018

A.J. Guban, Journey to the West, 2017

A.J. Guban, 36 Views, 2014

Outstanding Lighting Design

A.J. Guban, The Wild Party, 2018

Colin K. Bills, Journey to the West, 2017

A.J. Guban, Avenue Q, 2016

A.J. Guban, 36 Views, 2014

Outstanding Sound Design

Tom Teasley & Chao Tian, The White Snake, 2020

Gordon Nimmo-Smith, Matthew Schleigh, Brian Lotter,The Caucasian Chalk Circle, 2019

Tom Teasley, The Arabian Nights, 2018

Justin Schmitz, The Wild Party, 2018

Palmer Hefferan, Equus, 2017

Tom Teasley, Journey to the West, 2017 - WINNER!

Tom Teasley, The Fire and The Rain, 2016

Tom Teasley, The Love of the Nightingale, 2015

Tom Teasley, The Green Bird, 2012 - WINNER!

Tom Teasley, The Ramayana, 2011 - WINNER!

Tom Teasley, Crazyface, 2010 - WINNER!

Outstanding Ensemble in a Musical

Little Shop of Horrors, 2020

The Wild Party, 2018

Avenue Q, 2016 - WINNER!

Outstanding Ensemble in a Play

Melancholy Play: A Contemporary Farce, 2019

Peter and the Starcatcher, 2018 - WINNER!

Outstanding Lead Actress in a Musical

Shayla S. Simmons, Aida, 2019

Katy Carkuff, Avenue Q, 2016 - WINNER!

Outstanding Lead Actor in a Musical

Christian Montgomery, Little Shop of Horrors, 2020

Jimmy Mavrikes, The Wild Party, 2018

Matt Dewberry, Avenue Q, 2016

Outstanding Supporting Actress in a Musical

Alana Thomas, Little Shop of Horrors, 2020

Chani Wereley, Little Shop of Horrors, 2020

Kari Ginsburg, The Wild Party, 2018 - WINNER!

Jenna Berk, Urinetown, 2017

Emily Zickler, Avenue Q, 2016 - WINNER!

Jenna Berk, Avenue Q, 2016

Justine "Icy" Moral, Avenue Q, 2016

Outstanding Supporting Actor in a Musical

Marty Austin Lamar, Little Shop of Horrors, 2020

Da'Von Moody, Aida, 2019

Matt Dewberry, Urinetown, 2017

Vaughn Ryan Midder, Avenue Q, 2016 - WINNER!

Mikey Cafarelli, Avenue Q, 2016

Outstanding Lead Actress in a Play

Tonya Beckman, The Skin of Our Teeth, 2019

Billie Krishawn, Melancholy Play: A Contemporary Farce, 2019

Megan Graves, Peter and the Starcatcher, 2018

Outstanding Lead Actor in a Play

Scott Ward Abernethy, The Caucasian Chalk Circle, 2019

Dallas Tolentino, Journey to the West, 2017

Matthew Aldwin McGee, Taking Steps, 2013 - WINNER!

Outstanding Supporting Actress in a Play
Justine "Icy" Moral, Journey to the West, 2017
 

Outstanding Supporting Actor in a Play

Jordan Campbell, Peter and the Starcatcher, 2018

Matt Dewberry, Peter and the Starcatcher, 2018

Alex Vernon, Peter and the Starcatcher, 2018

Ryan Tumulty, Journey to the West, 2017

Outstanding Choreography in a PlayCasey Kaleba, Matthew R. Wilson, The Lieutenant of Inishmore, 2016

The Constellation Theatre Company was nominated for the following Audience Choice Awards
 2008 Crazyface (Favorite Ensemble) 
 2009 Three Sisters (Favorite Plays, Favorite Actress in a Play) 
 2013 Taking Steps (Best Play, Best Actor in a Play), Zorro (Best Ensemble Cast, Best Actor in a Play) 

Costume Designer Kendra Rai was awarded a 2014 Princess Grace Foundation honorarium to be used for the company's 2014–2015 season costumes

See also

Helen Hayes Award
Theater in Washington D.C.

References

Theatre companies in Washington, D.C.
Regional theatre in the United States
Members of the Cultural Alliance of Greater Washington
League of Washington Theatres
2007 establishments in Washington, D.C.
Arts organizations established in 2007